Morshikhinskaya is a rural locality (a village) in Vinogradovsky District, Arkhangelsk Oblast, Russia. The population was 12 as of 2010.

Geography 
Artyushinskaya is the nearest rural locality.

References 

Rural localities in Vinogradovsky District